Bustami (born July 1, 1982) is an Indonesian footballer who currently plays for PSAP Sigli in the Indonesia Super League.

Club statistics

References

External links

1982 births
Association football defenders
Living people
Indonesian footballers
Liga 1 (Indonesia) players
PSAP Sigli players
Indonesian Premier Division players